Fashion File was a Canadian television series, which aired on CBC Television and CBC Newsworld, as well as internationally in syndication, from 1989 to 2009. The series covered fashion industry news. Fashion File was created and developed by Karen Morrison, who was the program Series Producer & Director.

The series was hosted from its inception until 2006 by Tim Blanks, who left the show at the end of 2006 to join the Canadian fashion magazine Flare as editor-at-large. Over the winter of 2007, the CBC aired Fashion File Host Hunt, a short-run reality show in which ten finalists competed to become the new host of the show. Adrian Mainella was chosen as the new host of the series at the end of the Host Hunt. Other contestants included Peter Papapetrou, Manny Neubacher, Justin Singh, Paul Pogue, Mary Kitchen, Stephanie Pigott, Jamey Ordolis, Raji Sohal and Henrietta Southam. The judges were fashion magazine editors Bronwyn Cosgrave and Suzanne Boyd, and Fashion File executive producer Réjean Beaudin.  The series was hosted by Michelle Mama.

As of the end of March 2009, Fashion File was cancelled by CBC Television. The press release cites the "current financial situation."

References

External links
Trailers and Clips

CBC Television original programming
1980s Canadian television news shows
1990s Canadian television news shows
2000s Canadian television news shows
1989 Canadian television series debuts
2009 Canadian television series endings
Fashion-themed television series
Fashion journalism
CBC News Network original programming